One Night with a Stranger is the second album by English singer-songwriter Martin Briley, released in 1983. The album peaked at #55 on the Billboard Album chart, after debuting on May 7, 1983. This album featured the hit single "The Salt in My Tears", (No. 36 on the Billboard Hot 100), and the minor follow-up, "Put Your Hands on the Screen" both of which had music videos.

The album cover is mostly recreated as the opening shot in the video for "The Salt in My Tears."

Track listing
All songs written and arranged by Martin Briley.

 The Salt in My Tears (3:27)
 Just a Mile Away (4:06)
 Put Your Hands on the Screen (4:33)
 Maybe I've Waited Too Long (4:04)
 She's So Flexible (3:52)
 A Rainy Day in New York City (4:47)
 I Wonder What She Thinks of Me (3:52)
 Dumb Love (4:58)
 One Night with a Stranger (3:42)

Personnel
Martin Briley- lead vocals and backing vocals, lead guitars, piano and organ
Jamie Herndon- rhythm guitar and synthesizer
Robin Sylvester- bass
Pat Mastelotto- drums and tambourine
George Meyer- backing vocals

Production
Producer: Peter Coleman

References

Martin Briley albums
1983 albums
Mercury Records albums